The Sin of Helga Arndt (German: Die Sünde der Helga Arndt) is a 1916 German silent drama film directed by Joe May and starring Mia May, Theodor Burghardt and Frida Richard.

Cast
Mia May as Helga Arndt 
Theodor Burghardt as Engineer Berger
Frida Richard as Helga's mother
Hermann Wlach as Dr. Niklas, journalist

References

External links

Films of the German Empire
Films directed by Joe May
German silent feature films
German drama films
German black-and-white films
1916 drama films
Silent drama films
1910s German films
1910s German-language films